Whitegrass Airport , also known as White Grass Airport or Tanna Airport, is an airport on the island Tanna, in the Taféa province in Vanuatu.

Facilities
The airport supports small to mid-sized turboprop aircraft only.

The airport has a small terminal building and handful of support structures at the airport.

Transportation

The airport is reached by car or van and has a small parking area behind the terminal. A paved road provides access to west side of the island and to the settlement of Lowanatom to the south.

Airlines and destinations

References

External links
 
 

Airports in Vanuatu
Tafea Province